Spin This is a solo album by The Rembrandts' Danny Wilde, released by Elektra Records in 1998. The album is credited to "Danny Wilde + The Rembrandts." As a result, the album is still technically a full Rembrandts album, despite being released during the band's first split.

Van Dyke Parks contributed arrangements to a couple of songs.

Critical reception
AllMusic called the album "another collection of finely crafted pop songs."

Track listing
All songs written by Danny Wilde except as indicated.
"Shakespeare's Tragedy" (Wilde, Graham Edwards)
"Long Walk Back" (Wilde, Jesse Valenzuela)
"Out of Time" (Wilde, Edwards, Nick Trevisick, Charlie Midnight)
"Wishin' Well" (Wilde, Edwards)
"Summertime"
"Tomorrow's Mine"
"Get it Right"
"Eloise" (Wilde, Edwards)
"This Close to Heaven"
"Beautiful Thing"

References

1998 albums
The Rembrandts albums